Ustad Ghulam Sadiq Khan (22 August 1939 – 15 May 2016) was an Indian classical vocalist. He belonged to the Rampur-Sahaswan gharana.

Musical career
He was initiated into music at the age of nine by his father Ustad Ghulam Jafar Khan, who was an Indian sarangi player. Later, he continued his training under the guidance of Ustad Mushtaq Hussain Khan, who was the first recipient of the Padma Bhushan award in India.

He specialized in the khayal gayaki and also sang thumri, dadra and bhajans. He performed in India and abroad in the U.K., Australia, Saudi Arabia, Oman, Mauritius, Singapore, Hong Kong, Indonesia, Thailand, China and Afghanistan. He was a top graded artist of All India Radio and Doordarshan.

During the course of his career, he taught many disciples, including Jaspinder Narula (a Bollywood playback singer) and his son, Ustad Ghulam Abbas Khan who is a khayal and ghazal vocalist. He also taught his grandson Ghulam Hasan Khan, who is also a Hindustani classical vocalist. He worked as senior lecturer in the Faculty of Music at the University of Delhi.

In 2005, he received the Padma Shri for his contribution to Indian classical music.

Death
Ustad Ghulam Sadiq Khan died on 15 May 2016 (Sunday) at Max Healthcare, New Delhi.

References

1939 births
2016 deaths
Hindustani singers
Recipients of the Padma Shri in arts
Academic staff of Delhi University
20th-century Indian male classical singers
Indian music educators
20th-century Khyal singers